Cornel Mihart (born 25 September 1974) is a Romanian former professional footballer who played as a defender. In his career Mihart played 176 Liga I matches for important Romanian clubs such as: Dinamo București, Astra Ploiești, Petrolul Ploiești and Jiul Petroșani. In 2010 Cornel Mihart founded a football school named Sport Kids Drobeta, being the owner and one of the school's coaches.

Honours
Jiul Petroșani
Divizia B: 2004–05

References

External links
 
 

1974 births
Living people
People from Drobeta-Turnu Severin
Romanian footballers
Association football defenders
Liga I players
Liga II players
FC Drobeta-Turnu Severin players
FC Dinamo București players
FC Astra Giurgiu players
FC Petrolul Ploiești players
CSM Jiul Petroșani players
CSO Plopeni players
Romanian football managers